Leptodeuterocopus panamaensis is a moth of the family Pterophoridae that is known from Panama.

Adults are on wing in March.

External links

Deuterocopinae
Moths described in 2006
Endemic fauna of Panama